John Holliday may refer to:

 Doc Holliday (1851–1887), American dentist, gambler, and gunfighter, famed for the Gunfight at the O.K. Corral
 Doc Holliday (American football), American football coach
 John Holliday (barrister)
 John Holliday (judoka) (born 1960), British Olympic judoka
 John Holliday (pioneer), early American pioneer of Western Virginia
 John Holliday, guitarist of the British pop rock band The Escape Club
 John Holliday, a Texas freebooter who gave his name to Holliday, Texas
 Johnny Holliday, American radio sportscaster

See also
 John Holiday, an American operatic countertenor
 John Holladay, founder of Holladay, Utah
 John Halliday (disambiguation), several people